Baker County is a county in Georgia. As of the 2020 census, the population was 2,876. The county seat and only city is Newton. The county was created December 12, 1825 from the eastern portion of Early County by an act of the Georgia General Assembly and is named for Colonel John Baker, a hero of the American Revolutionary War.

Baker County is included in the Albany, GA Metropolitan Statistical Area.

The Baker County Courthouse (Georgia) is listed on the National Register of Historic Places. Three other properties in Newton are also listed on the register: Notchaway Baptist Church and Cemetery, Pine Bloom Plantation, and Tarver Plantation.

Geography

The eastern half of Baker County is located in the Lower Flint River sub-basin of the ACF River Basin (Apalachicola-Chattahoochee-Flint River Basin). The western half of the county is located in the Ichawaynochaway Creek sub-basin of the same ACF River Basin.

Major highways
  State Route 37
  State Route 91
  State Route 200
  State Route 216
  State Route 253

Adjacent counties
 Dougherty County, Georgia - northeast
 Mitchell County, Georgia - east
 Decatur County, Georgia - southwest
 Early County, Georgia - west
 Miller County, Georgia - west
 Calhoun County, Georgia - northwest

Demographics

2020 census

As of the 2020 United States Census, there were 2,876 people, 1,425 households, and 788 families residing in the county.

2010 census
As of the 2010 United States Census, there were 3,451 people, 1,372 households, and 892 families living in the county. The racial makeup of the county was 48.5% white, 46.7% black or African American, 0.7% Asian, 0.3% American Indian, 0.1% Pacific islander, 2.5% from other races, and 1.2% from two or more races. Those of Hispanic or Latino origin made up 4.2% of the population. In terms of ancestry, 7.3% were English, and 0.0% were American.

Of the 1,372 households, 30.0% had children under the age of 18 living with them, 44.2% were married couples living together, 15.9% had a female householder with no husband present, 35.0% were non-families, and 30.5% of all households were made up of individuals. The average household size was 2.52 and the average family size was 3.14. The median age was 41.6 years.

The median income for a household in the county was $27,462 and the median income for a family was $42,585. Males had a median income of $25,954 versus $25,688 for females. The per capita income for the county was $16,379. About 23.1% of families and 30.0% of the population were below the poverty line, including 49.1% of those under age 18 and 5.6% of those age 65 or over.

2000 census
As of the census of 2000, there were 4,074 people, 1,514 households, and 1,094 families living in the county. The population density was 12 people per square mile (5/km2). There were 1,740 housing units at an average density of 5 per square mile (2/km2). The racial makeup of the county was 50.39% Black or African American, 47.42% White, 0.22% Native American, 0.02% Pacific Islander, 1.33% from other races, and 0.61% from two or more races. 2.72% of the population were Hispanic or Latino of any race.

There were 1,514 households, out of which 33.10% had children under the age of 18 living with them, 47.70% were married couples living together, 19.50% had a female householder with no husband present, and 27.70% were non-families. 25.10% of all households were made up of individuals, and 10.80% had someone living alone who was 65 years of age or older. The average household size was 2.68 and the average family size was 3.20.

In the county, the population was spread out, with 27.30% under the age of 18, 10.00% from 18 to 24, 26.90% from 25 to 44, 22.10% from 45 to 64, and 13.70% who were 65 years of age or older. The median age was 35 years. For every 100 females, there were 86.20 males. For every 100 females age 18 and over, there were 86.30 males.

The median income for a household in the county was $30,338, and the median income for a family was $36,438. Males had a median income of $25,891 versus $16,462 for females. The per capita income for the county was $16,969. About 19.90% of families and 23.40% of the population were below the poverty line, including 32.50% of those under age 18 and 20.10% of those age 65 or over.

Education

Baker County School System operates public schools.

Politics
Although Barry Goldwater and Richard Nixon carried it in 1964 and 1972, American Independent candidate George Wallace won the county in 1968 as a third-party candidate. Baker County is historically Democratic. In 1956, Adlai Stevenson received over 96 percent of the county's vote. The county voted Democratic consistently from 1976 until 2012, but by closer margins than in 1956, and the county shifted more to the right throughout the early 2000s. In 2008 Barack Obama won with just 50.1 percent to John McCain's 49.1 percent, whilst Donald Trump won the county by almost ten percent in 2016, despite declining on Mitt Romney’s performance statewide. Brian Kemp repeated this feat by double digits in the 2018 gubernatorial race, and in 2020, Trump won Baker County by nearly sixteen percentage points.

Communities

City
 Newton

Unincorporated communities

 Anna
 Bethany
 Crestview
 Elmodel
 Hardup
 Milford
 Patmos

Ghost towns
 Cheevertown
 Dewsville
 Mimsville

See also

 National Register of Historic Places listings in Baker County, Georgia
List of counties in Georgia

References

External links
 Baker County Sheriff's Office
 Baker County historical marker

 
1825 establishments in Georgia (U.S. state)
Populated places established in 1825
Georgia (U.S. state) counties
Albany metropolitan area, Georgia